Maklakovo is a rural locality (a village) in Pertsevskoye Rural Settlement, Gryazovetsky District, Vologda Oblast, Russia. The population was 12 as of 2002.

Geography 
Maklakovo is located 43 km northeast of Gryazovets (the district's administrative centre) by road. Stanovoye is the nearest rural locality.

References 

Rural localities in Gryazovetsky District